Groveland is a census-designated place in Bingham County, Idaho, United States.  Its population was 877 as of the 2010 census.

The community was named for the groves of trees near the original town site.

Demographics

References

External links

Census-designated places in Bingham County, Idaho
Census-designated places in Idaho